California stop may refer to:
Idaho stop, a law allowing cyclists to treat stop signs as yield signs
PIT maneuver
The practice of slowing down, rather than stopping, at a stop sign